Michael Foley (born 12 January 1999) is a Canadian racing cyclist, who currently rides for UCI Continental team . He rode in the men's team pursuit event at the 2018 UCI Track Cycling World Championships. He qualified to represent Canada at the 2020 Summer Olympics.

Major results
2017
 2nd Team pursuit, National Championships
 3rd Road race, National Junior Road Championships
2018
 National Championships
1st  Team pursuit (with Derek Gee, Evan Burtnik & Adam Jamieson)
1st  Madison (with Derek Gee)
 3rd  Team pursuit, Commonwealth Games
2019
 Pan American Championships
1st  Points race
1st  Team pursuit (with Vincent De Haître, Jay Lamoureux & Derek Gee)
 National Championships
1st  Team pursuit (with Aidan Caves, Jay Lamoureux & Chris Ernst)
1st  Madison (with Derek Gee)

References

External links
 

1999 births
Living people
Canadian male cyclists
Sportspeople from Milton, Ontario
Cyclists at the 2018 Commonwealth Games
Commonwealth Games medallists in cycling
Commonwealth Games bronze medallists for Canada
Olympic cyclists of Canada
Cyclists at the 2020 Summer Olympics
Cyclists at the 2022 Commonwealth Games
Commonwealth Games competitors for Canada
21st-century Canadian people
Medallists at the 2018 Commonwealth Games